Fudbalski klub Trayal (Serbian Cyrillic: Фудбалски клуб Трајал) is a professional football club from Kruševac, Serbia. They currently compete in the Serbian First League, the second tier of the national league system.

History
The football club was formed in 1933 as a part of the "Obilićevo" sports association. It was named after the local gunpowder company "Obilićevo". They played the first match in November 1933 and beat Trgovački, also from Kruševac, with 6–0.

After World War II the gunpowder company changed name to "Miloje Zakić" and by mid-70s developed into what is today a tire manufacturer Trayal Corporation. The football club changed its name accordingly to Trayal.

The club remained in local and regional leagues for most of its history until after the NATO bombing of Yugoslavia. At the time, Trayal was playing in Serbian League Timok which was a 3rd tier of competition in FR Yugoslavia. The next 1999–2000 season saw the expansion of the Second League and Trayal gained promotion to the national level for the first time. Playing in the Second League group East, they finished mid-table in their first season.

Trayal remained in the Second League East for three consecutive seasons until they were relegated in 2001–02 season due to the reduction of the number of participating teams. The Trayal Corporation was privatized a few years later and the club fell back to obscurity.

Trayal's current rise started in 2016 when the club was taken over by Vladan Gašić, the son of the former Minister of Defence and the current director of the Security Intelligence Agency, Bratislav Gašić. The club took on from the half-season when they were near the bottom of the First Rasina District League (5th tier) with 18 points less than the first-ranked team Šanac. In the second part of the championship they recorded all 15 victories and in the end finished first with 3 points more than the closest competition. Between 2016 and 2018 they had three successive promotions and went from the 5th tier to the 2nd tier again.

They compete in the 2nd tier since 2018–19 Serbian First League.

Honours
Serbian League East (III)
 2017–18
Zone League West (IV)
 2016–17
Rasina District First League (V)
 2012–13, 2015–16

Seasons

Notes

Players

Current squad

*For recent transfers, see List of Serbian football transfers winter 2019–20.

Team management

Managerial history

References

External links
  at srbijasport.net
  at srbijafudbal.com

Football clubs in Serbia
Sport in Kruševac
Football clubs in Yugoslavia
Association football clubs established in 1933
1933 establishments in Serbia